The World Meeting of Families 2018 was the ninth World Meeting of Families and took place in Dublin, Ireland between 21 and 26 August 2018. The event began with an Opening Ceremony that occurred in each of Ireland's Dioceses. This was followed by a three-day Pastoral Congress at the RDS. The Meeting culminated in Pope Francis's visit to Ireland.

130,000 people attended the WMOF 2018, which was far below what was expected as when Pope John Paul II came to Ireland in 1979, 2.7 million people came to the event and a similar number was expected at the event in 2018.

Official hymn
On 2 June 2017, the World Meeting of Families 2018's official hymn, "A Joy For All The Earth" (written by Irish composer Ephrem Feeley) was launched in Dublin. Cardinal Kevin Farrell, Prefect of the Dicastery for the Laity, Family and Life, attended the launch. Recording of the hymn took place in Blackrock College Chapel. It features Professor Gerard Gillen on the organ.

Opening liturgy
On the evening of Tuesday 21 August, an Opening Ceremony occurred concurrently over the country's 26 Dioceses, typically (though not exclusively) in that Diocese's Cathedral. The main ceremony that evening occurred in the Archdiocese of Dublin. The Opening Liturgy was titled Le chéile le Críost ("Together with Christ"). Hymns, psalms and canticles were sung, incense was burned and prayers were said.

Pastoral Congress
The three-day Pastoral Congress occurred at the RDS between Wednesday 22 and Friday 24 August. There were daily workshops and discussions, with activities also designated for children between the ages of four and twelve and those between the ages of thirteen and seventeen. The centrepiece of every day was the Eucharist, celebrated in the Main Arena. Family activities at all times while the Mass was not underway. There was also a special "Voices of Impact: Women in Leadership Symposium" at the RDS on the Saturday morning of 26 August, ahead of Mass and live-feed broadcast of Pope Francis's Itinerary as he arrived in Ireland. There was, however, some disappointment expressed by a group which said it represented LGBT Catholics; the group said it felt excluded from the event after its request for a stall was turned down. Exhibition coordinator Paul McCann said the decision was made due to "uncertainty over the amount of space we will have available." The humanitarian campaign, Equal Future 2018, was launched during the course of the Pastoral Congress, with the intention of raising awareness around the world of the damage done to children and young people by LGBT stigma.

Festival of Families

The Festival of Families occurred at Croke Park on Saturday 25 August and marked the official arrival of Pope Francis at the World Meeting of Families. There were three hundred flag bearers. The Pope addressed those in attendance, heard the testimonies of five families from Burkina Faso, Canada, India, Iraq and Ireland, and he and the audience were entertained by an orchestra comprising more than fifty musicians; a choir of one thousand voices; more than seven hundred Irish, sean-nós and contemporary dancers; Daniel O'Donnell, Riverdance, an Andrea Bocelli and Celine Byrne duet of Franz Schubert's "Ave Maria" and Bocelli's rendition of "Nessun Dorma", the aria from the final act of Giacomo Puccini's opera Turandot. Patrick Bergin was onstage singing the Leonard Cohen song "Anthem" as the Pope arrived. Pope Francis also had a selfie taken with Alison Nevin, a twelve-year-old girl with medical issues from Swords, Dublin.

Knock Shrine
On the morning of Sunday 26 August, Pope Francis made a pilgrimage to Knock Shrine in County Mayo in the West of Ireland. Though a personal pilgrimage by Francis, after his announcement that he would be attending the conclusion of the World Meeting of Families 2018 and the expression of his wish to see the national Marian Shrine, this was added to the list of events on the website of the World Meeting of Families as being part of its programme, with the note that the anniversary of the Apparition of Our Lady coincided with the opening day of the World Meeting of Families 2018. The Pope paraded around the gathering pilgrims in his popemobile and prayed a rendition of the Angelus at the Apparition Chapel. He became the second Pope to visit Knock Shrine, following on from Pope John Paul II.

Final Mass
A Solemn Eucharistic Celebration commencing at 3:00 pm on Sunday 26 August and presided over by Pope Francis, at Phoenix Park in Dublin, brought about the conclusion of the World Meeting of Families 2018. In conjunction with the Dicastery for the Laity, Family and Life, the Diocese chosen to host the expected World Meeting of Families 2021 was announced at the Mass's conclusion. This was revealed to be Rome.

Pope Francis surrounded by thousands of people while travelling through the crowds in the Pope mobile before saying the Final Mass at the Papal Cross in Phoenix Park.

Criticisms
In November 2017, Bishop Brendan Leahy said that LGBT people must be made welcome at WMOF 2018. However, the Irish Bishops were overruled by Cardinal Kevin Farrell and all positive references to LGBT people included in WMOF materials were removed and LGBT people were told they were not welcome to attend. In April 2018, in response to the removal of LGBT references from WMOF materials, the organisers of Dublin Pride announced "We Are Family" as their 2018 theme. In August 2018, Mary McAleese, former President of Ireland and Catholic academic, confirmed she would not attend any of the WMOF events as she felt she and her family were not welcome. McAleese claimed the event was a "right wing rally" opposed to women and LGBT people. Ursula Halligan, a prominent Catholic and gay activist, organised a choir to sing outside the WMOF venue to highlight the perceived opposition to LGBT people. In August 2018, Allianz Insurance issued a statement denying they were "headline sponsors" of the event following a claim made by businesswoman and entrepreneur Norah Casey on RTÉ. In October 2019, it was reported that the event raised €11 million through fundraising in Ireland (€9 million less than intended) and incurred losses of €4.4 million.

References

External links
 Official website

August 2018 events in Europe
World Meeting of Families